= Dream Machine (Graphic novel) =

1. REDIRECT Draft:Dream Machine (Graphic novel)
